Parliamentary elections were held in Algeria on 5 March 1982. The country was a one-party state at the time, with the National Liberation Front (FLN) as the sole legal party. The FLN nominated 846 candidates for the 282 seats, with voters asked to express their preference by crossing out names on the ballot. Only 69 of the 136 incumbents who ran for re-election were successful. Voter turnout was 67.34%.

Results

References

Elections in Algeria
Algeria
1982 in Algeria
One-party elections
Election and referendum articles with incomplete results
March 1982 events in Africa